Mario Vega may refer to:

 Mario Daniel Vega (born 1984), Argentine football goalkeeper
 Mario Vega (pastor) (born 1958), Christian Pentecostal pastor